Sonia Almarcha (born 1972) is a Spanish actress.

Biography 
Born in Pinoso, province of Alicante, in 1972.

She studied at and graduated from the Valencia's Dramatic Art School (1986–1989). She further trained her acting chops at the William Layton lab, also taking diverse acting courses.

She landed her television debut role in 1995 in the series ¡Ay, Señor, Señor!, and her debut in a feature film in the 1996 film .

Her film performance in Jaime Rosales' Solitary Fragments (2007) earned her a Best New Actress award at the 17th Actors and Actresses Union Awards.

Filmography 

Television

Film

Accolades

References 

21st-century Spanish actresses
Spanish television actresses
Spanish film actresses
1972 births
Living people
Actresses from the Valencian Community